Hubert Leon Lampo (Antwerp, 1 September 1920 – Essen, 12 July 2006) was a Flemish writer, one of the founders of magic realism in Flanders. His most famous book is De komst van Joachim Stiller ("The coming of Joachim Stiller", 1960), in which a mysterious person, named Joachim Stiller, appears as a redeemer, under circumstances reminiscent of the death of Jesus. Other themes that occur in Lampo's work are the myths of Orpheus, Atlantis and the Holy Grail.

Bibliography (English)
 Hubert Lampo: Arthur and the Grail. Photogr. by Pieter Paul Koster. London, Sidgwick & Jackson, 1988.  
 Hubert Lampo: The coming of Joachim Stiller. Transl. by Marga Emlyn-Jones. New York, Twayne Publishers, 1974. 
 Hubert Lampo: 'The contemporary novel in Dutch'. In: The contemporary novel in Belgium. Brussels, 1970. No ISBN

See also
 Flemish literature

External links
Short biography
Bibliography

1920 births
2006 deaths
Flemish writers
Writers from Antwerp
Magic realism writers
20th-century Belgian novelists
Belgian male novelists
Belgian male short story writers
Belgian short story writers
Belgian essayists
20th-century short story writers
20th-century essayists
20th-century Belgian male writers